"God & Satan" is the sixth single from Biffy Clyro's fifth album, Only Revolutions. It was released on 23 August 2010 – exactly one year on from the release of the first proper single from the Only Revolutions marketing campaign, "That Golden Rule" ("Mountains", released in 2008, was originally claimed to be a stopgap, non-album release).

Music video
The music video was filmed sometime around June/July 2010. It premiered on Channel 4 at 00:10 am on 20 July 2010. The video begins with the band standing in a lake, their bodies submerged under the water with only their heads sticking out. Later, the band, part of a cult, walk through the countryside with a large group of people towards a woodland area where a celebration is taking place. At the end of the video, the band are laid down on the group and covered in rags.

Track listing
CD single 14FLR44CD, 5052498236022
"God & Satan [Single Version]"
"Hawkwind"

7" Vinyl 14FLR44, 5052498236176
"God & Satan [Single Version]"
"10 Bodies"

7" White Vinyl 14FLR44x, 5052498236275
"God & Satan [Single Version]"
"51 Trumpets"

iTunes Digital Single
"God & Satan"
"10 Bodies"
"51 Trumpets"
"Hawkwind"

Chart performance
On the week of physical release, the single entered the UK Singles Charts at 36, making it the sixth single from Only Revolutions to reach the top 40, and the least successful of these.

References

Biffy Clyro songs
2010 singles
Songs written by Simon Neil
Song recordings produced by Garth Richardson
2009 songs
14th Floor Records singles